This is the official list of candidates for the 2022 Malaysian general election, which was published on 5th November 2022 by the Election Commission of Malaysia (SPR).

This election saw a record 945 candidates contesting in all 222 parliamentary seats nationwide, among them a record 108 independent candidates.

Westhern Malaysia

Easthern Malaysia

See also 

 2022 Malaysian general election

References 

2022 elections in Malaysia